

Gambier Islands Group Marine Park is a marine protected area in the Australian state of South Australia located in state coastal waters around the Gambier Islands at the mouth of Spencer Gulf.

The marine park was established on 29 January 2009 by proclamation under the Marine Parks Act 2007. 

While the Marine Parks Act 2007 has provision for a marine park to be divided into a number of zone to ensure varying degrees of “protection for habitats and biodiversity” and varying levels of “ecologically sustainable development and use”, the whole extent of the Gambier Islands Group Marine Park has been placed in one zone, being “habitat protection” where “activities and uses that do not harm habitats or the functioning of ecosystems” are only permitted.

As of 2016, the marine park was classified as IUCN Category IV protected area.

See also
Protected areas of South Australia

References

External links
Gambier Islands Group Marine Park webpage
Gambier Islands Group Marine Park webpage on the Protected Planet website

Marine parks of South Australia
Spencer Gulf
Protected areas established in 2009  
2009 establishments in Australia